The chief justice of Canada is the presiding judge of the nine-member Supreme Court of Canada, the highest judicial body in Canada. As such, the chief justice is the highest-ranking judge of the Canadian court system. The Supreme Court Act makes the chief justice, a Crown in Council appointment, meaning the Crown acting on the advice of the prime minister and minister of justice. The chief justice serves until they resign, turn 75 years old, die, or are removed from office for cause. By tradition, a new chief justice is chosen from among the court's incumbent puisne justices.

The chief justice has significant influence in the procedural rules of the Court, presides when oral arguments are held, and leads the discussion of cases among the justices. The chief justice is also deputy governor general, ex-officio chairman of the Canadian Judicial Council, and heads the committee that selects recipients of the Order of Canada. Additionally, a chief justice also assumes the role of Administrator of Canada and exercises the viceregal duties of the governor general upon the death, resignation or incapacitation of the governor general.

Richard Wagner has served as the current chief justice of Canada since 2017. Since the Supreme Court was established in 1875, 18 people have served as chief justice. The court's first chief justice was William Buell Richards; Beverley McLachlin is the longest serving Canadian chief justice, and was the first woman to hold the position.

Appointment 
The chief justice is appointed by the Governor in Council under the Supreme Court Act on the advice of the prime minister. The appointment is subject to the Supreme Court Act, which governs the administration and appointment of judges of the court. By this component of the Constitution of Canada, Judges appointed to the court must be "a judge of a superior court of a province or a barrister or advocate of at least ten years standing at the bar of a province."

Tradition dictates that the chief justice be appointed from among the court's puisne judges; in the history of the Court, only two were not: William Buell Richards, and Charles Fitzpatrick. It is also customary that a new chief justice be chosen alternately from among: the three justices who by law must be from Quebec (with its civil law system), and the other six justices from the rest of Canada (representing the common law tradition). Since 1933, this tradition has only been broken once, when Brian Dickson of Manitoba was named to succeed Bora Laskin of Ontario in 1984.

Duties 
The chief justice's central duty is to preside at hearings before the Supreme Court. The chief justice presides from the centre chair. If the chief justice is absent, the senior puisne judge presides.

Judicial Council
The chief justice chairs the Canadian Judicial Council, which is composed of all chief justices and associate chief justices of superior courts in Canada. This body, established in 1971 by the Judges Act, organizes seminars for federally appointed judges, coordinates the discussion of issues of concern to the judiciary, and conducts inquiries, either on public complaint or at the request of a federal or provincial minister of justice or attorney general, into the conduct of any federally appointed judge.

Other duties 
The chief justice is sworn as a member of the Privy Council prior to taking the judicial oath of office. The chief justice also sits on the advisory council of Canada's highest civilian order, the Order of Canada. In practice however, the chief justice abstains from voting on a candidate's removal from the order, presumably because this process has so far only applied to individuals convicted in a lower court of a criminal offence, and could create a conflict of interest for the chief justice if that individual appealed their conviction to the Supreme Court.

Under the Electoral Boundaries Readjustment Act, each province has a three-person commission responsible for modifying that province's federal ridings. The chair of each such commission is appointed by the chief justice of that province; if no appointment is made by the provincial chief justice, the responsibility falls to the chief justice of Canada.

Administrator of Canada
The Constitution Act, 1867 provides that there can be an "Administrator for the Time being carrying on the Government of Canada." The Letters Patent, 1947 respecting the Office of Governor General provide that, should the governor general should die, become incapacitated, or be absent from the country for a period of more than one month, the chief justice or, if that office is vacant, the senior puisne justice, of the Supreme Court would become Administrator of Canada and exercise all the powers and duties of the governor general. This has happened on four occasions: chief justices Lyman Duff and Robert Taschereau each did so, in 1940 and 1967 respectively, following the death of the incumbent governor general, as did Chief Justice Beverley McLachlin when the Governor General underwent surgery in 2005. With the resignation of Julie Payette in January 2021, Richard Wagner served as Administrator until the appointment of Mary Simon as Governor General in July of the same year.

The chief justice and the other justices of the court serve as deputies of the governor general for the purpose of giving Royal Assent to bills passed by Parliament, signing official documents or receiving credentials of newly appointed high commissioners and ambassadors.

Current chief justice
The current chief justice is Richard Wagner, who took office on December 18, 2017, succeeding Beverley McLachlin. He previously sat on the Quebec Court of Appeal.

List of chief justices
Since the Supreme Court was established in 1875, the following 18 persons have served as Chief Justice:

This graphical timeline depicts the length of each justice's tenure as chief justice:

Notes

References

Supreme Court of Canada

Lists of Canadian judges